Change of direction (COD) is any activity that involves a rapid whole-body movement with a pre-planned change of velocity or direction.

In elite sports, the speed at which an athlete can do a change of direction is especially valuable in court and field sports. Strength and conditioning coaches in such sports program various exercises to train their athletes in this regard.

See also
Agility

References

 Effect of Different Physical Training Forms on Change of Direction Ability: a Systematic Review and Meta-analysis
 TrainHeroic Presents: The Training Lab.
 Key Concepts in Preparing for Agility and Change of Direction
 Top 5 Change Of Direction Drills for Athletes

Sports terminology
Physical exercise